Carlos Alberto Sacheri (October 22, 1933 in Buenos Aires – December 22, 1974) was an Argentine thomist philosopher and scholar. He was shot and killed by ERP members on 22 December 1974 in Buenos Aires; he was targeted because of his perceived anticommunism. He was a disciple of the priest Julio Meinvielle (a well-known doctrinarian of the Argentine nationalist movements). The most widespread of his publications was The Clandestine Church (1971), a denunciation of modernism and liberation theology from traditional positions.

Biography 
Sacheri joined the Argentine Catholic Action during his high school studies. He entered the Faculty of Law and Social Sciences of the University of Buenos Aires to study law, but he dedicated little time to his first profession; he met Father Meinvielle during his studies, and joined the summation groups that he directed. Influenced by the reading of Thomas Aquinas, played by Meinvielle, Sacheri began studying philosophy at the UBA. He graduated in 1957, and with a scholarship from the Arts Council of Canada he moved to Laval University (Quebec) to study philosophy under the direction of the Canadian Thomist Charles de Koninck. He graduated in 1963, and five years later obtained his doctorate with a thesis on The Existence and Nature of Deliberation.

He returned to Argentina in 1967, where he took over the work of the Cité catholique, in place of engineer Roberto Gorostiaga. He obtained a teaching position at UBA -teaching Philosophy of Law and History of Philosophical Ideas- and at the recently created Argentine Catholic University -Scientific Methodology and Social Philosophy-, where he was invited by Bishop Octavio Nicolás Derisi. He would later become a visiting professor at the Institute of Comparative Philosophy in Paris, teaching Ethics and Social Philosophy, at Laval University, and at Andrés Bello University in Caracas.

On December 22, 1974, at the age of 41, he was murdered in the city of Buenos Aires in front of his family as he was returning from Mass by a commando of the ERP-22 de Agosto guerrilla organization, who acknowledged the fact in a communiqué and, moreover, a file on the event was later found in a building belonging to that organization. Hector Hernández says he doubts whether Sacheri was killed by Marxist guerrillas or by ASA terrorism.

Bibliography

Sacheri's works 

 1968: Necessity and nature of deliberation
 1970: The Clandestine Church
 1974: The Church and the Social
 1980: The Natural Order

References 

1933 births
1974 deaths
20th-century Argentine philosophers
Argentine anti-communists
Argentine people of Italian descent
Deaths by firearm in Argentina
People from Buenos Aires
People killed in the Dirty War